Sally Jean Floyd (May 20, 1950 – August 25, 2019) was an American computer scientist known for her work on computer networking. Formerly associated with the International Computer Science Institute in Berkeley, California, she retired in 2009 and died in August 2019.  She is best known for her work on Internet congestion control, and was in 2007 one of the top-ten most cited researchers in computer science.

Biography
Born in Charlottesville, Virginia, Floyd received a BA in Sociology from the University of California - Berkeley in 1971. She received an MS in Computer Science in 1987 and a PhD in 1989, both from UC - Berkeley. Her PhD was completed under the supervision of Richard M. Karp.

Floyd is best known in the field of congestion control as the inventor of Random Early Detection ("RED") active queue management scheme, thus founding the field of Active Queue Management (AQM) with Van Jacobson. Almost all Internet routers use RED or something developed from it to manage network congestion.  Floyd devised the now-common method of adding delay jitter to message timers to avoid synchronization.

Floyd, with Vern Paxson, in 1997 identified the lack of knowledge of network topology as the major obstacle in understanding how the Internet works. This paper, "Why We Don't Know How to Simulate the Internet", was re-published as "Difficulties in Simulating the Internet" in 2001 and won the IEEE Communications Society's William R. Bennett Prize Paper Award.

Floyd is also a co-author on the standard for TCP Selective acknowledgement (SACK), Explicit Congestion Notification (ECN), the Datagram Congestion Control Protocol (DCCP) and TCP Friendly Rate Control (TFRC).

She received the IEEE Internet Award in 2005 and the ACM SIGCOMM Award in 2007 for her contributions to congestion control. She has been involved in the Internet Architecture Board, and was in 2007 one of the top-ten most cited researchers in computer science.

Awards
 2007 - SIGCOMM Award from the ACM Special Interest Group on Data Communications.  Recognized as most prestigious award to a scientist in computer networking.
 IEEE Communications Society's William R. Bennett Prize Paper Award for "Difficulties in Simulating the Internet", by Floyd and Vern Paxson

Personal life and death
Floyd's father Edwin was a mathematician at the University of Virginia. Floyd was married to Carole Leita.

Floyd died at the age of 69 on August 25, 2019 in Berkeley, California from gallbladder cancer that had metastasized.

Selected notable papers
 S. Floyd and V. Jacobson, "Random Early Detection Gateways for Congestion Avoidance", IEEE/ACM Transactions on Networking (1993)
 S. Floyd and K. Fall, "Promoting the Use of End-to-End Congestion Control in the Internet", IEEE/ACM Transactions on Networking (1993)
 V. Paxson and S. Floyd, "Wide Area Traffic: The Failure of Poisson Modeling", IEEE/ACM Transactions on Networking (1995)
 M. Mathis, J. Mahdavi and S Floyd, A Romanow, "TCP Selective Acknowledgement Options", RFC 2018 (1996)
 S. Floyd and V. Paxson, "Why We Don't Know How to Simulate the Internet", Dec. 1997, Proceedings of the 1997 Winter Simulation Conference.  Re-written as "Difficulties in Simulating the Internet", IEEE/ACM Transactions on Networking, vol. 9, no. 4 (August 2001).  Winner of the IEEE Communications Society William R. Bennett Prize Paper Award, 2001.

References

External links
 Sally Floyd's biography at ICSI retrieved 8th Jan 2011

American computer scientists
Fellows of the Association for Computing Machinery
Internet pioneers
University of California, Berkeley alumni
University of California, Berkeley staff
American women computer scientists
Women Internet pioneers
1950 births
2019 deaths
Deaths from gallbladder cancer
Deaths from cancer in California
People from Charlottesville, Virginia
21st-century American women